Suurrahu (also known as Haeskarahu and Suurerahu;) is a  uninhabited Estonian islet in Matsalu Bay (part of the Väinameri Sea), on the territory of the Matsalu National Park. Administratively Suurrahu belongs to the Haeska village in Ridala Parish, Lääne County.

The islet is covered by coastal meadow and the coastline by reed bed.

References

Uninhabited islands of Estonia
Ridala Parish
Estonian islands in the Baltic